Katrien M. Devos is an American plant geneticist who is distinguished research professor at the University of Georgia. Her research considers the structure, function and evolution of the genomes of grasses. In particular, Devos considers halophytic turfgrasses, cereals and bioenergy crops. She was elected Fellow of the American Association for the Advancement of Science in 2016.

Early life and education 
Devos became interested in plant genetics during her undergraduate studies. She was a doctoral researcher at Ghent University, where she studied wheat and Triticeae genetic mapping. She moved to the United Kingdom as a postdoctoral researcher, where she used comparative genetics to better understand cereals. In the United Kingdom, she worked in John Innes Centre were she created the concept of crop circles, which considers the relationship between grass genomes.

Research and career 
In 1996 Devos was awarded a Biotechnology and Biological Sciences Research Council David Phillips Fellowship to start her independent scientific career, where she started working on genome evolution. Devos worked with the International Crops Research Institute for the Semi-Arid Tropics to create a millet cultivar for food crops in the developing world. These millet crops were bred to have improved resistance to downy mildew.

Devos moved to the University of Georgia in 2003, where has focused on understanding the genetics of grasses. These investigations have included target crops such as wheat, panicum virgatum foxtail millet, eleusine coracana. By sequencing the genome of pearl millet, Devos was able to identify a dwarfing gene, the first gene that causes an agronomic trait that was ever isolated.

Awards and honors 
 2016 Elected Fellow of the American Association for the Advancement of Science
 2017 University of Georgia Research Foundation's Creative Research Medal
 2017 D.W. Brooks Award for Excellence in Research
 2018 CSIRO Distinguished Visiting Scientist Fellowship
 2019 Elected Fellow of the Crop Science Society of America

Selected publications

References 

Living people
21st-century American women scientists
University of Georgia faculty
Ghent University alumni
Soil scientists
Year of birth missing (living people)
Fellows of the American Association for the Advancement of Science
American women academics